Macrosoma bahiata is a moth-like butterfly species described by Rudolf Felder and Alois Friedrich Rogenhofer in 1875. It belongs to the family Hedylidae. Originally it belonged to the genus Phellinodes. Malcolm J. Scoble combined it with Macrosoma in 1986.

Distribution
The species is found in East Mexico, Quintana Roo Territory through Central America to Lima, Peru. East to Belém, Bahia, Brazil at the mouth of the Amazon.

Description

Wings
M. bahiata has wings of greyish brown ground colour. The apex of the forewing is dark brown and very weakly emarginate. Small white marks are usually merged at proximal edge of dark apical patch. And prominent, dark, postmedial spot towards middle of wing is found.
The length of the forewing is 19–24 mm.

Genitalia

Male
Following are the characteristics of the male genitalia:
 The medial component of Gnathos is lateral not downcurved nor denticulate.
 Valva is subtriangular, broad at base.

Female
The female genitalia has the following features:
 Anal papillae is relatively long. 
 Ductus bursae broadens suddenly into Corpus bursae.
 Signum is denticulate.

Antenna
The antenna is not bipectinate in both sexes.

Diagnosis
The prominent postmedial spot on the forewing enables M. bahiata to be get distinguished from M. uniformis, M. albistria, and M. coscoja, the species to which it looks most similar. The shape of the Gnathos is a usefully a distinguishing feature.

References
 Macrosoma bahiata - Overview - Encyclopedia of Life.
 Catalogue of Life.
 A catalogue of the Hedylidae (Lepidoptera: Hedyloidea), with descriptions of two new species.
  An identification guide to the Hedylidae (Lepidoptera: Hedyloidea).

Sources

Hedylidae
Butterflies described in 1875
Hedylidae of South America
Taxa named by Rudolf Felder
Butterflies of North America
Butterflies of Central America